Altura Credit Union (Altura) is the largest  credit union headquartered in Riverside County, California, with over 175,000 members and assets in excess of $2 billion (as of December 2022). As a federally insured, state-chartered financial institution, Altura operates 21 full-service branches and its deposit assets are insured by the National Credit Union Share Insurance Fund (NCUSIF). Altura offers a wide range of financial products and services that include checking and savings accounts, new and used auto loans, commercial and residential mortgage loans, and wealth management services. Altura's banking platform includes online banking, mobile banking, web bill pay, and online/mobile loan applications. Altura also belongs to the CO-OP shared branching network, which provides its members with fee-free access to over 5,200 branches (CU Service Centers) and more than 30,000 ATMs (CO-OP Financial Services).

Institutional History
Altura was originally founded in 1957 as Riverside Schools Credit Union in order to serve the banking and financial needs of county school district employees. In 1998, it merged with Riverside County Federal Credit Union, which served both private and public sector employees in Riverside County, and was re-named Riverside County's Credit Union.

In 2004, after expanding its field of membership to include Riverside County, San Diego County, and select cities in Orange County and San Bernardino County, Riverside County's Credit Union was renamed Altura Credit Union, in order to reflect the growth in its geographical service area. The re-naming appropriates the Spanish word, 'altura,' which translates to height, elevation, or altitude, and was also accompanied by the adoption of a new corporate logo and brand identity.

Merger with Visterra Credit Union
In 2015, Altura and Visterra Credit Union (Visterra), which was also based in Riverside County, announced a merger between the two financial institutions. The development reflected a mutual desire to better serve the needs of their combined members. The merger, which was finalized on August 1, 2015, created a $1.1 billion credit union with 118,000 Members. At the time that the merger was announced, Altura managed $757.3 million in assets and served nearly 84,000 Members, while Visterra managed $335.6 million in assets and served approximately 34,000 Members. The merged institutions retained the Altura name. On March 1, 2016, Altura completed the final phase of the merger process - the conversion and integration of their respective core systems.

This steady trajectory of growth has led Altura to become the largest credit union headquartered in Riverside County.

Membership
Altura's field of membership is set by the California Department of Financial Protection and Innovation.  Membership in Altura is open to anyone who lives, works, worships or attends school in Riverside County, San Diego County, and select cities in Orange County [Anaheim, Garden Grove, Irvine, and Santa Ana] and San Bernardino County [Rancho Cucamonga, Ontario, and Fontana]. Following its merger with Visterra, Altura's field of membership expanded further to include U.S. military, government and civilian employees of the March Air Reserve Base in Riverside County, and retirees of the U.S. Armed Forces.

College Scholarship Program
In 1993, the Altura Foundation, the charitable arm of Altura, established a college scholarship program. Any student graduating from a public or private high school in Riverside County is eligible to apply, and the endowed scholarships include, among others, the Bonnie Gail Polis Educational Endowment, the Terry Ferrone Memorial Scholarship, the Altura Board of Directors Educational Endowment, and the Dr. Linda Wisher Educational Endowment. Since the program's inception, the Altura Foundation has awarded $526,950 in college scholarships to assist and support 586 Riverside County high school seniors in their pursuit of higher education.

Community Philanthropy
Altura contributes to non-profit, charitable, educational, military support, police, public service, and business support organizations throughout the Inland Empire. In addition to monetary contributions, Altura's employees are encouraged to support their favorite organizations by volunteering their time. Since 2015, Altura has donated over $4,700,000 to local organizations.

Branch Locations
Altura Credit Union operates 19 full-service branch locations and 52 Altura-branded ATM in Riverside County. Altura members also have access to over 5,200 shared branching locations and 30,000 free ATMs nationwide.

City of Riverside: 
 Riverside Avenue branch - 6403 Riverside Avenue, Riverside, CA 92506
 14th Street branch - 3451 14th Street, Riverside, CA 92501
 Magnolia branch - 10725 Magnolia Avenue, Riverside, CA 92505 
 Canyon Springs branch - 2692 Canyon Springs Parkway, Suite C, Riverside, CA 92507
 University Avenue branch - 1616 University Avenue, Riverside, CA 92507
 Woodcrest branch - 17094 Van Buren Boulevard, Riverside, CA 92504

City of Moreno Valley:
 Cactus branch - 23540 Cactus Avenue, Moreno Valley, CA 92553
 Stoneridge branch - 27130 Eucalyptus Avenue, Suite E, Moreno Valley, CA 92555

City of Murrieta:
 Murrieta branch - 40412 Murrieta Hot Springs Road, Murrieta CA 92563
 Bear Creek branch - 36068 Hidden Springs Road, Unit 9, Wildomar, CA 92595
 Silver Hawk branch - 38995 Sky Canyon Drive, Murrieta CA 92563

City of Corona:
 Corona Plaza branch - 2331 Compton Avenue, Corona, CA 92881
 Corona Lincoln branch - 650 South Lincoln Avenue, Suite 101, Corona CA 92882

Desert Region:
 Rancho Mirage branch - 36101 Bob Hope Drive, Suite E-9, Rancho Mirage, CA 92270
 Indio branch - 81096 Highway 11, Indio, CA 92201
 West Hemet branch - 320 South Sanderson Avenue, Hemet, CA 92545
 Coachella branch - 50057 Cesar Chavez, Suite A, Coachella, CA 92236
 Sun Lakes branch - 300 South Highland Springs Ave, Banning, CA 92220
 San Jacinto branch - 1821 South San Jacinto Avenue, Suite G, San Jacinto, CA 92583

AutoExpert
Altura operates a subsidiary company, Auto Expert. Auto Expert is an auto locating and buying service that assists Altura's members (as well as members of 11 partner credit unions) in finding and purchasing their next pre-owned and/or new vehicle. In 2007, Auto Expert received the California Award for Performance Excellence (CAPE) Gold Award. This highly competitive and coveted honor is the California equivalent of the Malcolm Baldrige National Quality Award. CAPE recognizes companies that demonstrate superior performance in seven key business areas including leadership; strategic planning, customer and market focus, measurement and knowledge management, human resources, process management and business results.

Institutional Milestones
 1957 Charter granted for Riverside City Schools Employees Credit Union to serve Riverside Unified School District classified employees.
 1963 Charter enlarged to include all school employees of Riverside County, changed the name o Riverside Schools Credit Union Charter and expanded to include certificated employees
 1965 Reached $1 million in assets
 1973 Moved to Riverside Avenue location
 1984 Opened 10,000th account; began offering VISA card
 1988 Mark Hawkins replaced Shirley Barden as President; reached $40 million in assets
 1989 Changed name to Riverside County Schools Credit Union
 1992 Established RCSCU's own ATM network
 1993 Altura Foundation launches the College Scholarship Program 
 1995 Opened Member Service Center; reached $100 million in assets; RCSCU Foundation (for scholarships) approved by the IRS; introduced VISA Check Card
 1998 Riverside County Schools Credit Union merged with Riverside County Federal Credit Union to form Riverside County's Credit Union, with $250 million in assets and 60,000 members.
 2004 Re-named to Altura Credit Union
 2011 Received the Marketing Association of Credit Unions Gold Award for advertising campaign
 2012 Named the “Favorite Credit Union” by readers of The Press-Enterprise newspaper in its 17th Annual Readers’ Choice Awards.
 2014 Highlanders Sports Properties of Learfield Sports, the multimedia rights partner of the University of California, Riverside (UCR) and Highlander Athletics, announced a new, four-year exclusive partnership that granted Altura a visible presence on the UCR campus, with Highlander Spirit Debit Cards, in-game promotions, venue branding, and the placement of an ATM in SRC Arena.
 2015 Announced merger with Visterra, which served military and civilian employees of March Air Reserve Base and military retirees
 2015 Ofelia Valdez-Yeager was elected Chairperson of the Board of Directors, becoming the first woman to hold that title in Altura's history. 
 2015 Completed merger with Visterra Credit Union on August 1, 2015
 2016 Altura President & CEO Mark Hawkins announced that he would retire in February 2017 after 29 years of service.
 2017 Altura's Board of Directors announced on January 11, 2017, that Jennifer Binkley had been selected as the new President/CEO. Binkley had been Altura's executive vice president and chief operating officer since 2008, and previously was president of Altura's AutoExpert subsidiary from 2002 until 2008.

References

Credit unions based in California
Banks established in 1957
Companies based in Riverside County, California